Tobin Lake is a resort village in the Canadian province of Saskatchewan within Census Division No. 14. It is on the shores of Tobin Lake in the Rural Municipality of Moose Range No. 486.

History 
Tobin Lake incorporated as a resort village on August 1, 1973.

Demographics 

Government 
The Resort Village of Tobin Lake is governed by an elected municipal council and an appointed administrator that meets on the third Wednesday of every month. The mayor is Robert Taylor  and its administrator is Chelsey Parkinson.

See also 
List of communities in Saskatchewan
List of municipalities in Saskatchewan
List of resort villages in Saskatchewan
List of villages in Saskatchewan
List of summer villages in Alberta

References

External links 

Resort villages in Saskatchewan
Moose Range No. 486, Saskatchewan
Division No. 14, Saskatchewan